This is an alphabetical list of villages in Tiruchirappalli district, Tamil Nadu, India.

A 

 Adavathur East
 Adavathur West
 Adhanur
 Agaram
 Alathur
 Allur
 Alundur
 Amayapuram
 Anbil
 Andanallur
 Appananallur
 Arasangudy
 Asur
 Azad Road

B-E 

 Balakrishnampatti
 Dharmanathapuram
 Edangimangalam Vellanur
 Elandapatti
 Elangakurichy
 Ellakudy
 Elur Pudupatti

I-J 

 Iluppaiyur
 Inam Kulathur
 Jeeyapuram

K 

 Kadiyakurichy
 Kallakudi
 Kalpalayam
 Kalpalayathanpatti
 Kandalur
 Kannanurpalayam
 Karattuppatti
 Kattuputhur
 Kilakurichy
 Kilamullakudy
 Kiliyur
 Konalai
 Kulumani
 Kumaravayalur
 Kumbakudy
 Kuvalakkudy

M 

 M.Karuppampatti
 Malvoy
 Manamedu Trichy
 Maniyankurichy
 Manjakkorai
 Manpidimangalam
 Maruvathur
 Mettupalayam
 Mudikandam
 Mullikarumbur
 Mutharasanallur

N-O 

 Nachikurichy
 Nagamangalam
 Nambukurichi
 Natarajapuram
 Navalpattu
 Navalurkottapattu
 Olaiyur

P 

 Paganur
 Palaganangudy
 Palancavery
 Palur
 Panayakurichy
 Paneyapuram
 Pangayarselvi
 Pathalapattai
 Periakaruppur
 Periyanayakichatram
 Perungamani
 Perungudi
 Perur
 Peruvalla Nallur
 Podavur
 Ponnampatti
 Poovalur
 Pukkathurai
 Puliancholai
 Pullambadi
 Purathakudi
 Puthanampatti

S 

 Samayapuram
 Sengattuppatti
 Sethurapatti
 Sholamadevi
 Sholanganallur
 Sirugamani
 Somarasampettai
 Sooriyur

T 

 Tannirpalli
 Thayanur
 Thirumangalam
 Thirupparaithurai
 Thiruppattur
 Thiruthalaiyur
 Thiruthiyamalai
 Thiruvallarai
 Tiruchendurai
 Tirunedunkulam

U-V 

 Uppiliapuram
 Uthamsevi
 Valavandankottai
 Velampatti
 Vengur

Tiruchirappalli district